Rosman may refer to:

Places
Rosman, North Carolina,  United States

People
Given name
 Rosman García (1979–2011), Venezuelan relief pitcher in Major League Baseball
 Rosman Sulaiman (born 1982), Singaporean soccer player
Surname
 Alice Grant Rosman (1882–1961), Australian novelist
 Carl Rosman (born 1971), Australian clarinettist
 Mackenzie Rosman (born 1989), American actress and singer
 Mark Rosman (born 1957), American film director, television director and screenwriter
 Katherine Rosman (born 1972), American journalist
 Stacey Rosman (born 1981), Australian netball player

Other
Rosman Research Station
Rosman Ferries, a privately owned ferry operator on Sydney Harbour

See also
Rossmann (disambiguation) (including Roßmann or Rossman)
Rozman